Contra Vision Ltd was founded in 1985. There are two wholly owned subsidiaries: Contra Vision North America, Inc., which operates out of Atlanta, USA, covering the North American market and surrounding countries; and Contra Vision Supplies Ltd, which operates across the other continents of the world from a base in Stockport, UK.

Contra Vision sells a range of perforated window films to printers for them to produce see-through graphics. Contra Vision also offers other see-through graphics products including non-perforated window films and printed interlayers for laminated glass.

The company was awarded a Queen’s Award for Enterprise: Innovation in 2015. This followed a Queen’s Award for Enterprise: International Trade in 2014.

References

External links
 http://www.contravision.com/
http://www.contravision.com/media/139162/Patent_Schedule_10-03-2015-Approved.pdf

Film and video technology